Samuel Bowman (May 21, 1800 – August 3, 1861) was an American suffragan Episcopal Bishop of Pennsylvania, United States.

Early life and family
Bowman was born in Wilkes-Barre, Pennsylvania, the son of Samuel Bowman, a captain in the Continental Army, and his wife, Eleanor Ledlie.  He was educated at the Academy of Wilkes-Barre and, while he was initially inclined toward the practice of law, Bowman soon changed his studies toward the church.  His theological instruction was conducted by Bishop William White.  White ordained Bowman deacon in 1823, and he was ordained priest the following year, also by White.  After his ordination to the priesthood, Bowman took charge of two parishes in Lancaster County. In 1825, he became rector of Trinity Church in Easton, Pennsylvania.  He returned to Lancaster in 1827 to serve at St. James Church in that town, assisting the rector there until his death in 1830, at which time Bowman became rector.  While there, Bowman earned a doctorate in divinity from his Geneva College (now Hobart and William Smith Colleges).

Bowman married twice. He was first married to Susan Sitgreaves of Easton, with whom he had three children, one of whom died young.  His son, Samuel Sitgreaves Bowman, graduated from Yale University in 1845 and studied law in Philadelphia, but died unmarried, predeceasing his father in 1848.  Bowman's daughter, Ellen Ledlie Bowman, survived her father and died in 1894 in Topeka, Kansas, having married Thomas H. Vail, the Episcopal Bishop of Kansas, in 1867.  After Susan died in 1831, Bowman remarried to Harriet Clarkson, the daughter of the previous rector of St. James, Lancaster.  Bowman's brother, Alexander Hamilton Bowman, was Superintendent of the United States Military Academy at West Point, New York during the American Civil War.

Coadjutor bishop
In 1845, the clergy elected him Bishop of Pennsylvania, but when the laity refused to concur, Bowman acquiesced in the nomination of Alonzo Potter, who was eventually chosen.  In 1847, Bowman was elected Bishop of Indiana, but he declined the appointment, preferring to remain in Lancaster.  Bowman was consecrated a suffragan Bishop of Pennsylvania in 1858, and this appointment he accepted.  He was the 64th bishop in the ECUSA, and was consecrated in Christ Church, Philadelphia, by Bishops Jackson Kemper, William Heathcote DeLancey, and Alfred Lee.  Bowman threw himself immediately into his work, but his episcopate was brief.  While visiting the western part of Pennsylvania in 1861 on the Allegheny Valley Railroad, a landslide wrecked a railroad bridge, causing the passengers, including Bowman, to walk several miles.  Bowman lingered behind, and was later found dead along the tracks, either of apoplexy or a heart attack.  He was buried in St. James churchyard in Lancaster.

Notes

References
 
 
 
 
 

1800 births
1861 deaths
People from Wilkes-Barre, Pennsylvania
19th-century American Episcopalians
Episcopal bishops of Pennsylvania
Railway accident deaths in the United States